Barbara Thaler (born 16 February 1982) is an Austrian politician who was elected as a Member of the European Parliament in 2019. She has since been serving on the Committee on Transport and Tourism. In addition to her committee assignments, she is part of the Parliament's delegation for relations with India and the European Parliament Intergroup on Small and Medium-Sized Enterprises (SMEs).

References

Living people
1982 births
MEPs for Austria 2019–2024
Social Democratic Party of Austria MEPs
Social Democratic Party of Austria politicians
21st-century women MEPs for Austria